Masahiko Fukube (born 6 September 1961) is a Japanese wrestler. He competed in the men's Greco-Roman 100 kg at the 1988 Summer Olympics.

References

External links
 

1961 births
Living people
Japanese male sport wrestlers
Olympic wrestlers of Japan
Wrestlers at the 1988 Summer Olympics
Place of birth missing (living people)
Asian Wrestling Championships medalists
20th-century Japanese people